Alfred Mechtersheimer (13 August 1939 – 22 December 2018) was a former Bundestag member, a politician and author of the "Neue Rechte" (New Right). A former German Air Force colonel and a spokesperson for the far-right "Deutschland-Bewegung" (Movement for Germany), Mechtersheimer was known for his protest against Germany's participation in NATO.

Mechtersheimer was a leading figure in the peace movement in the late 1970s and early 1980s, and one of the founders of the ecopax movement. Consequently, Mechtersheimer's political career has seen him move from Bavarian CSU to the Greens in the 1980s. Later he distanced himself from the Greens as well, for their, he thought, lack of patriotism. Afterwards Mechtersheimer organized various movements known for their "stridently nationalist brand of national pacifism". He called his politics since the 1990s "Nationalpazifismus" (literary 'National- pacifism').

References 

Living people
Members of the Bundestag for Baden-Württemberg
Members of the Bundestag 1987–1990
People from Neustadt an der Weinstraße
1939 births
Members of the Bundestag for Alliance 90/The Greens
Politicians affected by a party expulsion process